Jacobs Creek, Jacob's Creek or Jacob Creek may refer to:

Places

In Australia
Jacobs Creek (Australia), a tributary of the North Para River
 Jacobs Creek (Victoria), a tributary of the Tyers River
Jacob's Creek (wine), a brand of Australian wine
Jacob's Creek Open Championship, a golf tournament

In Canada
Jacob Creek (Alberta)

In the United States
Jacobs Creek (Kansas), a tributary of the Cottonwood River
Jacobs Creek (Missouri), a tributary of Hazel Run
Jacobs Creek (Youghiogheny River tributary), in Pennsylvania
Jacobs Creek (Monongahela River tributary), a stream in Fayette County, Pennsylvania
Jacobs Creek, Pennsylvania, a community in Westmoreland County

Other
Jacobs Creek flood, Kansas, USA
Jacobs Creek, a late 1960s band, founded by Lon & Derrek Van Eaton

See also